Stuart Roy St. Clair (born 21 November 1949) is an Australian former politician and lobbyist who was a member of the Australian House of Representatives for the Division of New England between 1998 and 2001, representing the Nationals. St. Clair served as the chief executive of the Australian Trucking Association between 2006 and 2015.

Career 
Born in Sydney in 1949, St. Clair was educated at Sydney Church of England Grammar School (Shore) and spent his early life as a small businessman in the timber industry as a merchant, sawmiller and truck driver before becoming involved in politics in the 1980s. He was elected to Guyra Shire Council in 1987 and became mayor in 1991 until his election as the Member for New England.

In 1998, St. Clair was preselected to succeed Ian Sinclair as the Nationals candidate for New England. He contested and won the subsequent election and served on a number of parliamentary committees during the 39th Parliament. In 2001, St. Clair was defeated by independent Tony Windsor on a 21-point swing, ending a nearly 80-year hold on the seat by the Nationals.  

St. Clair then became the senior political advisor to the Deputy Prime Minister and Minister for Transport, John Anderson. In March 2006, St. Clair was appointed Chief Executive of the Australian Trucking Association until his retirement in 2015. St. Clair moved to the Margaret River area of Western Australia and continued his association with the Nationals, becoming Chairman of the Vasse Branch in 2016.

St. Clair is currently 2018–2019 the President of the Rotary Club of Busselton–Geographe Bay and a playing member of the Busselton Golf Club.

External links 
Link to ATA bio for St. Clair
Pandora Archive of St. Clair’s website as MHR for New England

1949 births
Living people
National Party of Australia members of the Parliament of Australia
Members of the Australian House of Representatives
Members of the Australian House of Representatives for New England
Australian lobbyists
Australian chief executives
21st-century Australian politicians
20th-century Australian politicians
People educated at Sydney Church of England Grammar School